Walton Mountains is an isolated chain of three predominantly snow-covered mountain masses, rising to about 1,450 m at Mount McArthur, extending south from Schubert Inlet for 25 miles (40 km) in central Alexander Island, Antarctica. The mountains were first sighted from the air by Lincoln Ellsworth on November 23, 1935, and roughly mapped from photos obtained on that flight by W.L.G. Joerg. Resighted from the air by the United States Antarctic Service in 1940, and in 1947 by the Ronne Antarctic Research Expedition under Ronne. Ronne named the mountains after Lieutenant Colonel R.C. Walton, United States Marine Corps, of the Office of Naval Research, who was instrumental in obtaining the loan of a ship from the Navy and in securing Navy assistance for the Ronne expedition.

See also

 Havre Mountains
 Lassus Mountains
 Rouen Mountains

References

Mountains of Alexander Island